USS Stalwart may refer to the following ships operated by the United States Navy:

 , an Acme-class coastal minesweeper later redesignated Unclassified Miscellaneous Auxiliary (IX-231); commissioned from 1942–1946.
 , an Aggressive-class minesweeper, AM-493, redesignated ocean minesweeper (MSO-493); commissioned from 1957–1966.
 , a modified tactical auxiliary general ocean surveillance ship; commissioned from 1984–2002; as of 2006, Stalwart is a training ship owned by State University of New York Maritime College

See also

References

United States Navy ship names